Jennifer Leigh Rohn (born 1967 in Stow, Ohio) is a British-American scientist and novelist. She is a cell biologist at University College London, editor of the webzine LabLit.com and founder of the Science is Vital organization that campaigns against cuts to the public funding of science in the United Kingdom.

Education 
Rohn graduated from Oberlin College with a Bachelor of Arts degree in Biology in 1990. Following this Rohn was awarded a Doctor of Philosophy degree in 1996 from the University of Washington for work on Feline leukemia virus (FeLV).

Career and research
After postdoctoral research at the Cancer Research UK London Research Institute (now incorporated into the Francis Crick Institute) studying apoptosis and cancer with Gerard Evan, Rohn moved to the Netherlands to lead a research group at the biotech start-up company, Leadd BV.  After moving into scientific publishing for a few years,  Rohn joined University College London in 2007, setting up her own group in the Centre for Nephrology at University College London in 2015.

Rohn's initial research interest was in virology. Over the following 15 years Rohn studied apoptosis and the shape of cells. Rohn's current research interests include study of urinary tract infections. Rohn works with engineers to put antibiotics within core-shell capsules to treat persistent urinary tract infections. Rohn grows bladder epithelia in culture to test new treatments for urinary tract infections.

Publications
Rohn's first novel, Experimental Heart, was published by Cold Spring Harbor Laboratory Press (CSHLP) in 2008.  This is written in the  lab lit genre, which she is well known for championing, and represents a departure for CSHLP, which had previously only published scientific non-fiction. Her second novel, The Honest Look, was also published by CSHLP in November 2010. Her third novel, Cat Zero, was published by Bitingduck Press in June 2018. Rohn has also had short fiction, news and opinion published in Nature and The Guardian

Awards and honours
In 2011, Rohn won the inaugural Research Fortnight "Achiever of the Year" award, and received the Society for Experimental Biology's President's Medal in the Education and Public Affairs Section. She won the Suffrage Science award in 2013.

References

1967 births
Living people
21st-century American novelists
21st-century American biologists
American women novelists
Science activists
Academics of University College London
Novelists from Ohio
University of Washington alumni
21st-century American women writers
People from Stow, Ohio
Francis Crick Institute alumni
American women academics